Vicky Rodewyk (born 20 November 1988) is an actress, photographic model and dancer from New Zealand. She has appeared in various TV commercials and shows, such as Barney, Shortland Street and an episode of Cloud 9's series Revelations – The Initial Journey. Vicky is best known for playing the role of moaning air-head Gel in the Cloud 9 produced TV series The Tribe. She was one of 5 new main characters introduced to the fifth and final series of the show. Vicky has also appeared on the ABC TV produced TV show Strictly Dancing with dance partner Sean Patterson, where she revealed she hadn't considered dance until she was introduced into it through a program at school. In 2008, Vicky appeared in the hit show Power Rangers: Jungle Fury playing a minor role, the character Gabby, a dance student. She featured in episode 23, 'Fear and Phantoms'.

References

External links

Gel
Vicky Rodewyk « The Tribe Cast

New Zealand television actresses
Living people
1988 births
New Zealand people of Dutch descent
Place of birth missing (living people)
New Zealand soap opera actresses
20th-century New Zealand actresses
21st-century New Zealand actresses